Danganronpa: The Animation is an anime television series produced by Lerche, based on Spike Chunsoft's 2010 visual novel Danganronpa: Trigger Happy Havoc. The thirteen episode adaptation aired on MBS' Animeism programming block between July and September 2013. The series is licensed by Crunchyroll (formerly known as Funimation) in the English-speaking regions of North America, Australia and United Kingdom and Muse Communication in Southeast Asia and South Asia. The series was succeeded by an anime-original sequel to the game series, Danganronpa 3: The End of Hope's Peak High School, which aired in 2016.

Plot

Danganronpa: The Animation follows the events of the video game Danganronpa: Trigger Happy Havoc. The series follows 16 high school students locked inside "Hope's Peak Academy," their high school. The students are threatened by an anthropomorphic bear, Monokuma, who gives them only one way to leave the Academy: to murder another student, and not be found guilty in the subsequent trial.

Characters

The Animation follows protagonist  and fifteen other students. Each character has an "ultimate" skill, or profession; such as the "Ultimate Gambler", or "Ultimate Swimmer". When dubbed from Japan they are usually called "Super High School Level."

Release
In December 2012, Kadokawa Shoten's Newtype magazine announced that there would be an anime television series adaptation of the game, titled Danganronpa: The Animation, produced by Lerche, directed by Seiji Kishi, and written by Makoto Uezu. The final Blu-ray/DVD volume, released on 26 February 2014, contains an extended final episode. The series aired in Japan on MBS' Animeism programming block between 4 July 2013 and 26 September 2013. The series is licensed in North America by Funimation, who simulcast it as it aired and released the series on BD/DVD on 10 November 2015. Funimation's English dub contains almost a completely different cast from that of the games, with only Bryce Papenbrook reprising his role as Makoto Naegi. Manga Entertainment released the series in the United Kingdom on 9 November 2015.

Soraru. Monokuma (Nobuyo Ōyama).

The soundtrack was released on August 28, 2013 by Geneon Universal (now NBCUniversal Entertainment Japan), one of the anime's production companies.

In 2014, The 19th Animation Kobe committee chose Kishi to receive their Individual Award for the stretch of his career including Danganronpa: The Animation, Arpeggio of Blue Steel, and Hamatora.

Sequel
A second anime series, titled Danganronpa 3: The End of Hope's Peak High School, aired between July and September 2016. The series concludes the "Hope's Peak Academy" storyline and is split into two parts; Future Side which takes place after Danganronpa 2: Goodbye Despair, and Despair Side, which takes place prior to the events of Trigger Happy Havoc. Seiji Kishi once again directed the series at Lerche, while Norimitsu Kaihō wrote the screenplay.

Notes

References

External links
 Danganronpa: The Animation on Crunchyroll
 

2013 anime television series debuts
Anime television series based on video games
Animeism
Crunchyroll anime
Danganronpa
Fiction about death games
Lerche (studio)
Muse Communication
NBCUniversal Entertainment Japan
Television shows written by Makoto Uezu